Subrata Sen is the Joseph F. Cullman III professor and researcher at Yale University. He has a bachelor's degree in electrical engineering from the Indian Institute of Technology Kharagpur, an MS degree in industrial engineering from the New York University Tandon School of Engineering, and a PhD degree in industrial administration from Carnegie Mellon University.

References

Polytechnic Institute of New York University alumni
Carnegie Mellon University alumni
Living people
Year of birth missing (living people)
Yale University faculty
Business theorists
Marketing theorists